DYFX (1305 AM) Radyo Agila is a radio station owned and operated by the Eagle Broadcasting Corporation. The station's studio and transmitter facilities are located along Cebu South Coastal Rd., Brgy. San Roque, Talisay, Cebu.

History
The station began operations in 1972 as a music-formatted station However, after a few months, it was closed at the time when Martial Law was declared, along with its main station in Metro Manila, DZEC. DYFX resumed its broadcast in December 1977 with a news and talk format. Back then, it was located at Pajeres Bldg. along Osmena Blvd., Cebu City.

DYFX went off-air for the second time in circa 2003 due to technical difficulties. It was relaunched on July 27, 2017, on its new home in Cebu South Coastal Road in Talisay, Cebu in time for the Iglesia ni Cristo's 103rd anniversary and the 50th Anniversary of EBC this year.

References

DYFX
News and talk radio stations in the Philippines
Radio stations established in 1972
Iglesia ni Cristo